Mahagnao Volcano also known as part of (Mahagnao Volcano Natural Park) is a dormant stratovolcano located in the Barangay Mahagnao part of the municipality of Burauen province of Leyte, Philippines. It is also bounded by the municipalities of La Paz and MacArthur. The area is mostly composed of wetland forests and also the birth of many rivers and streams flowing on many part of Burauen and on its neighboring towns.

Because of numerous streams, rivers and similar kind bodies of water, Burauen has been known with its nicked name as the Spring Capital of Leyte.
Mahagnao Volcano Natural Park is about 65 kilometers south of Tacloban City and 18 kilometers away from the town center of Burauen.

Physical Features
Located on the volcano flanks are fumaroles and mudpots.

On the southern flank of the volcano, two crater lakes are located, Lakes Danao and Malagsom. Hot Springs are located on the southern shore of Lake Danao (not to be confused with the other Lake Danao which is located near Ormoc City and part of Lake Danao Natural Park). Lake Malagsom is a crater lake with green acidic water.

Rocks primarily found on the volcano are andesite.

Eruptions
An eruption was reported to have occurred in 1895. It is a preatic eruption

Listings
The Philippine Institute of Volcanology and Seismology (PHIVOLCS) classifies Mahagnao as Inactive volcano. Although the volcano has been inactive, it is classified as potentially active due to the active thermal features of the mountain.

Mahagnao Volcano Natural Park
Mahagnao Volcano is the focal point of the Mahagnao Volcano National Park created on August 27, 1937 with Proclamation No. 184 with an area encompassing . Under the National Integrated Protected Areas System (NIPAS) of the Department of Environment and Natural Resources, the park was renamed to Mahagnao Volcano Natural Park with Proclamation No. 1157 on February 3, 1998.

See also
 List of active volcanoes in the Philippines
 List of potentially active volcanoes in the Philippines
 List of inactive volcanoes in the Philippines
 List of protected areas of the Philippines

References

External links
 "Pictures of Mahagnao Volcano National Park"
 PHIVOLCS Volcano Monitoring (archived)
 

Stratovolcanoes of the Philippines
Subduction volcanoes
Volcanoes of Leyte
Mountains of the Philippines
Inactive volcanoes of the Philippines
Landforms of Leyte (province)